Saint Bernard School is a private, Roman Catholic high school in Uncasville, Connecticut.  It is located in the Roman Catholic Diocese of Norwich and is co-sponsored by the Xaverian Brothers.

The early years
Saint Bernard was established in 1956 as an all-girls school in New London, Connecticut.  The school became coeducational in 1958. In 1967, the New London Campus reverted to an all-girls school, while a new boys' school opened in Uncasville. In addition, another all-girls school named Notre Dame opened in Norwich, Connecticut. This three-school model only lasted five years due to high operating costs and in 1972, the Norwich diocese closed Notre Dame and St. Bernard Girls' School, merging them with the Boys' school in Uncasville.

The former Notre Dame campus has since served as Three Rivers Community College Mohegan Campus and in the fall of 2008 became Norwich Regional Technical High School.

Notable alumni 

 Brook Fordyce, Class of 1989
 Ross Garber, Class of 1985
 Harold Pressley, Class of 1982
 Joseph Stallcop, Class of 2014

Notes and references

External links
 
 Roman Catholic Diocese of Norwich

Catholic secondary schools in Connecticut
Schools in New London County, Connecticut
Educational institutions established in 1956
Montville, Connecticut
1956 establishments in Connecticut